Charles Michael Thompson (born January 24, 1951) is an American politician serving as the U.S. representative for  (known as the 1st congressional district until 2013, and the  until 2023) since 1999. The district, in the outer northern portion of the San Francisco Bay Area, includes all of Napa County and parts of Contra Costa, Lake, Solano, and Sonoma Counties. Thompson chairs the House Gun Violence Prevention Task Force. He is a member of the Democratic Party.

Early life, education and career
Thompson was born in St. Helena, California, the son of Beverly Ann (née Forni) and Charles Edward Thompson. His father was of English ancestry and his mother was of Italian and Swiss descent. He was educated at California State University, Chico, served in Vietnam with the United States Army's 173rd Airborne Brigade, was a vineyard owner and maintenance supervisor, taught Public Administration and State Government at San Francisco State University and California State University, Chico, and was a member of the California State Senate before entering the House.

Early political career
Thompson served as an aide to Jackie Speier (then a state Assemblywoman) before winning election to the California State Senate in 1990. He unseated 4th district incumbent Jim Nielsen after a controversy over Nielsen's primary residence; Thompson's margin of victory was less than 1%.

After the 1992 general election, State Senator Barry Keene of the neighboring 2nd district resigned. Thompson, whose hometown of St. Helena had shifted from the 4th district into the 2nd after reapportionment, ran in the 1993 special election for Keene's seat. He narrowly beat Republican businesswoman Margie Handley and was reelected in 1994.

National Democrats approached Thompson about running for Congress in 1996 against freshman Republican Frank Riggs. Thompson's state senate district was virtually coextensive with the congressional district. Thompson declined, believing his senate seniority would be more beneficial to his district than would his being a freshman U.S. congressman. But in 1998, Thompson was due to be termed out of the state senate, and opted to run for Congress. Riggs retired and made an unsuccessful bid for United States Senate. Thompson was elected by almost a 30% margin and has been reelected 10 times without substantive opposition, turning what was a swing district for most of the 1980s and '90s into a fairly safe Democratic seat.

For his first seven terms, Thompson represented a district stretching from the far northern part of the San Francisco Bay Area all the way to the North Coast. But after the 2010 census, his district was renumbered as the 5th district and made somewhat more compact, losing most of its northern part to the 2nd district.

U.S. House of Representatives

Tenure
Thompson is a member of the conservative Blue Dog Coalition. As of October 2021, he had voted in line with Joe Biden's stated position 100% of the time.

Political positions

Abortion
Thompson is a Roman Catholic, but is pro-choice. In May 2004, he and 47 other Catholic Democratic members of Congress sent a letter to Cardinal Theodore McCarrick of Washington, D.C. to dissuade him from refusing to administer Holy Communion to Catholic members who practice pro-choice legislative voting. In February 2006, he was one of 55 Democratic U.S. Representatives identifying as Catholic who signed a "Statement of Principles" that affirmed a commitment to their faith but acknowledged opposition to Catholic doctrine on some issues. They wrote that on those issues, such as abortion rights, they would follow their conscience instead of the church's teachings. In response, the U.S. Catholic Bishops issued a "Statement on Responsibilities of Catholics in Public Life" that said, in part, "Catholic teaching calls all Catholics to work actively to restrain, restrict and bring to an end the destruction of unborn human life."

Thompson opposed the overturning of Roe v. Wade, calling it "an assault on women."

Cannabis
In 2015, Thompson proposed tougher penalties for marijuana growers who operate on trespassed land. The United States Sentencing Commission adopted the tougher sentencing guidelines, which went into effect in November 2015, after a six-month congressional review. The guidelines were intended to increase public safety.

Environmental issues
Thompson voted for Bush's Healthy Forests Initiative, which some environmentalists saw as a favor to the timber industry. He has disappointed some environmentalists with votes against limits to new commercial logging roads in Alaska's Tongass National Forest and against limits to hunting bears over bait. He was also one of only 30 Democrats to vote against an amendment to maintain roadless areas protected under the Roadless Rule. Thompson received a B rating from the American Wilderness Coalition in 2003 and an A+ in 2004.

The Sierra Club endorsed Thompson for reelection in 2010.

Thompson has voted several times to weaken the Clean Water Act.

In March 2012, Thompson and Assemblyman Jared Huffman voiced their opposition to a piece of water legislation that the House would be voting on, which Thompson argued would "kill local jobs, ignore 20 years of established science and overturn a century of California water law."

Foreign policy
In late 2002, Thompson joined Representatives Jim McDermott and David Bonior on a fact-finding trip to Iraq. During the trip, they spoke to officials in Baghdad and residents of Basra. They expressed skepticism about the Bush administration's claims that Saddam Hussein was stockpiling weapons of mass destruction.

On March 26, 2008, Muthanna Al-Hanooti, an official of a Michigan charity, was accused of underwriting three members of Congress to travel to Iraq on behalf of Iraqi intelligence officials. McDermott's office was already organizing the trip when the charity offered to pay the trip expenses. McDermott's spokesman claimed the charity was fully vetted by the U.S. government. He also stated that the representatives obtained a license from the State Department's Office of Foreign Assets Control for the group to travel to Iraq.

Thompson has supported military intervention in certain foreign countries.

Health care
Thompson has supported a public option for health insurance. In 2009, he wrote, "[b]y streamlining health care, reducing fraud and abuse, ending unnecessary testing, discouraging over-utilization, investing in smart reforms, and emphasizing preventive health care, we can significantly bring down the cost of health care." In 2010, Thompson voted for the Patient Protection and Affordable Care Act.

Committee assignments

 Committee on Ways and Means
 Subcommittee on Health
 Subcommittee on Tax Policy

Caucus memberships
 Blue Dog Coalition
 Co-chair of the Congressional Wine Caucus
 Congressional Arts Caucus
 Congressional NextGen 9-1-1 Caucus
Climate Solutions Caucus
U.S.-Japan Caucus

Electoral history

Personal life

Thompson is married to Janet Thompson. They met at a party in Yountville, California. They reside in St. Helena and also maintain a home in Washington, D.C.

The Thompsons are avid home cooks and cook for fundraisers to benefit local nonprofits, such as for renovations to the Point Reyes Lighthouse, and Thompson's campaigns. Local Napa Valley wineries often sponsor Thompson's campaigns with lunches, dinners, wine tastings and tours. Thompson is also a longtime volunteer for the Napa Valley wine auction fundraiser.

References

External links

 Congressman Mike Thompson official U.S. House website
 Mike Thompson for Congress campaign website
 
 

|-

|-

|-

|-

1951 births
21st-century American politicians
United States Army personnel of the Vietnam War
American people of English descent
American people of Italian descent
American people of Swiss descent
Democratic Party California state senators
California State University, Chico alumni
California State University, Chico faculty
Living people
Democratic Party members of the United States House of Representatives from California
People from St. Helena, California
San Francisco State University faculty
United States Army soldiers